Washington County Railroad or Railway may refer to:
Washington County Railroad (1980), short line in Vermont
Washington County Railroad (1900–1901), predecessor of the Pittsburgh and West Virginia Railway in Pennsylvania
Washington County Railroad (1856–1868), predecessor of the Southern Pacific Company in Texas
Washington County Railroad (1864), predecessor of the Baltimore and Ohio Railroad in Maryland
Washington County Railway (1903–1911), predecessor of the Maine Central Railroad in Maine
Washington County Railroad (1893–1903), predecessor of the above